Rauvolfia mannii grows as a shrub or small tree up to  tall. Its fragrant flowers feature white to pink or red-brown, or yellow corolla lobes. Its habitat is forests from sea level to  altitude. The plant has been used as arrow poison. Rauvolfia mannii is native to central Africa.

References

mannii
Plants used in traditional African medicine
Flora of West-Central Tropical Africa
Flora of East Tropical Africa
Plants described in 1894